The 4th New Jersey Regiment was raised on September 16, 1776, at Elizabethtown, New Jersey, for service with the Continental Army. The regiment would see action at the Battle of Brandywine, Battle of Germantown and the Battle of Monmouth. The regiment was disbanded on February 7, 1779, at Elizabethtown, New Jersey.

References

External links
Bibliography of the Continental Army in New Jersey compiled by the United States Army Center of Military History

Military units and formations established in 1776
Military units and formations disestablished in 1779
New Jersey regiments of the Continental Army
1776 establishments in New Jersey